This is a list of properties and districts in Carroll County, Georgia that are listed on the National Register of Historic Places (NRHP).

Current listings

|}

References

Carroll
Buildings and structures in Carroll County, Georgia